Jack Anthony Clark (born November 10, 1955), nicknamed "Jack the Ripper", is an American former professional baseball right fielder and first baseman. He played in Major League Baseball (MLB) for the San Francisco Giants, St. Louis Cardinals, New York Yankees, San Diego Padres, and Boston Red Sox from 1975 to 1992.

A four-time All-Star In an 18-season career, Clark was a .267 hitter with 340 home runs and 1180 RBI in 1994 games. He also collected 1,118 runs, 332 doubles, 77 stolen bases, 1,262 bases on balls and 1,826 hits in 6,847 at-bats. He batted and threw right-handed.

Career

San Francisco Giants 
Clark began his minor league baseball career in 1973 with the Great Falls Giants where he played the outfield and third base and had a 0-2 record in 5 games as a pitcher. In 1974, he led the league with 117 RBIs with Fresno. The following year, he led the league with 23 home runs with Lafayette.

His 26-game hitting streak in 1978 is the longest by a Giants player after 1900. He won the first Willie Mac Award in 1980 for his spirit and leadership. 

On the other hand, Clark frequently complained about the cold and windy conditions at Candlestick Park, the Giants' home park. He had a rift with manager Frank Robinson, and some members of the Giants front office thought Clark took too long to recover from injuries.

St. Louis Cardinals 
On February 1, Clark was traded to the St. Louis Cardinals for shortstop José Uribe, pitcher Dave LaPoint, and first basemen-outfielders David Green and Gary Rajsich. He switched to first base to reduce risk of injury. His three-run home run against the Los Angeles Dodgers in game 6 of the 1985 NLCS was the pennant-clinching hit for the Cardinals.

Clark's fielding, never his specialty, played a pivotal role in the 1985 World Series. Umpire Don Denkinger's notorious controversial call in Game 6 came from Clark's throw to Todd Worrell at first. Clark would later misplay a foul popup that, while not ruled an error, should have been caught. Darrell Porter later admitted that he called off Clark but hesitated at the last minute when he thought Clark had called for the catch, which Clark had not. This opened the door for the Kansas City Royals to score two runs in the bottom of the 9th to win Game 6, and go on to capture the World Series in Game 7 the following night.
 
In 1987, despite a rift with St. Louis All-Star shortstop Ozzie Smith, Clark had his best season. He hit .286 with 35 home runs, 106 RBI, and led the league in on-base percentage (.459) and slugging percentage (.597). He accomplished all this despite missing 31 games due to nagging injuries and finished third in the MVP vote.  Clark again led the Cardinals to the World Series that year, although an ankle injury limited him to one at-bat in the postseason.

New York Yankees 

Clark signed a two-year contract with the New York Yankees prior to the 1988 season.  He was primarily a designated hitter (DH), because of the presence of Don Mattingly at first base. Clark enjoyed playing for manager Billy Martin, but he didn't get along with Martin's successor, Lou Piniella. At the end of the season, he requested a trade.

San Diego Padres 
After the 1988 season, the Yankees traded Clark to the San Diego Padres with Pat Clements for Lance McCullers, Jimmy Jones, and Stan Jefferson. Regarding his time in the American League, he said, "I hate that damn league. Every game lasts –4 hours. No wonder the fans are bored over there."  He played for the Padres for two seasons. In 1990, he feuded with All-Star teammate Tony Gwynn, who was widely respected by his peers and known as one of the most dedicated players in baseball. Clark called him selfish and stated that Gwynn should be swinging with runners in scoring position instead of bunting and protecting his batting average. "No one bothers Tony Gwynn because he wins batting titles, but the Padres finish fourth or fifth every year", he said (in the two seasons he played with the team, they finished 2nd and 5th, respectively). Joe Carter, who played for the Padres in 1990, said, "It just involved one great guy, and that's Tony Gwynn, and anything they want to say about Tony Gwynn is going to be news. It got all blown out of proportion." Gwynn countered, "I've been doing the same things my whole career, playing the same way. Now, why is it an issue? Because Jack Clark says it is."

In early 1991, after leaving the Padres, Clark called Padres manager Greg Riddoch "a bad, bad man, and he's sneaky. He's a snake. Well, not just a snake, but a s-s-s-n-n-n-a-ke." Clark said of the San Diego fans: "Everything that they should cheer for they'd boo for, and everything they should boo for they'd cheer for ... Tony, he's perfect for them. He just plays the whole thing up, and the town is so stupid that they can't see." Gwynn responded with his own criticism of Clark: "Let's talk about him walking 104 times, being a No. 4 hitter. Let's talk about his not flying on team flights. Let's talk about him getting booted out of games on a called strike three."

Boston Red Sox 
Clark returned to the American League in 1991, signing with the Boston Red Sox for three years over the Padres' offer of only one. Clark served primarily as Boston's DH, hitting 28 home runs his first year with the team.

After hitting only five home runs in a truncated 1992 season, Clark was waived by Boston in February 1993 and was signed to a minor league contract by the Montreal Expos during 1993 spring training. He was released later that year without appearing in a regular season game with the Expos, and retired shortly thereafter.

Retirement 
Clark was named manager of the River City Rascals, a new Frontier League independent minor league team, in their inaugural season in 1999.

Clark served as the Los Angeles Dodgers' hitting coach for the 2001 through 2003 seasons.

In October 2008, Clark was named manager of the Springfield Sliders of the Central Illinois Collegiate League, which merged into the Prospect League for 2009. Clark caught criticism from an article in The State Journal-Register after missing ten of the Sliders' 26 home games with no telling how many road games he attended.

Controversies

Bankruptcy
Clark was driven into bankruptcy in 1992 by his appetite for luxury cars. According to his bankruptcy filing, he owned 18 luxury automobiles, including a 700,000 Ferrari and a Rolls-Royce. Clark was trying to pay 17 car payments simultaneously, and whenever he got bored with a car he would get rid of it and just buy another one. He ended up losing his 2.4 million home and his drag-racing business because of his extravagant spending habits. Despite one of the most publicized bankruptcies in baseball, Clark reportedly got back on his feet in the late 1990s.

Talk radio
Clark was hired as a sports talk host on St. Louis radio station WGNU in August 2013, co-hosting "The King and the Ripper" with longtime St. Louis radio personality Kevin "the King" Slaten.  At least twice during the show's first week, Clark accused Los Angeles Angels slugger Albert Pujols of using performance-enhancing drugs (PEDs) while Pujols was with the Cardinals. Clark had said that he talked to Pujols' former personal trainer and said that "I know for a fact he was" using PEDs. Pujols responded by threatening Clark and WGNU with a defamation lawsuit, and vehemently denied that he had ever used PEDs.  The trainer added that he hadn't even talked to Clark in over ten years. InsideSTL Enterprises, the company that owns WGNU's weekday airtime through a time brokerage agreement, cut ties with Clark and Slaten after only seven shows. On October 4, 2013, Pujols filed a lawsuit against Clark. In response on October 14, Clark challenged Pujols to both take polygraph tests to resolve who is telling the truth.  However, on February 10, 2014, Clark apologized and retracted his accusations against Pujols, saying he had "no knowledge whatsoever" that Pujols ever used PEDs.  "During a heated discussion on air, I misspoke", Clark said.  In return, Pujols dropped the suit.

See also

 List of Major League Baseball career home run leaders
 List of Major League Baseball career runs scored leaders
 List of Major League Baseball career runs batted in leaders

References

External links

 Baseball Evolution Hall of Fame – Player Profile
 https://web.archive.org/web/20070625154951/http://stl.sabr.org/fungoes/?p=723
 "Jack Clark Files for Bankruptcy" NY Times

   

1955 births
Living people
Major League Baseball right fielders
Major League Baseball first basemen
Major League Baseball designated hitters
Baseball players from Pennsylvania
Major League Baseball hitting coaches
Minor league baseball managers
National League All-Stars
San Francisco Giants players
St. Louis Cardinals players
New York Yankees players
San Diego Padres players
Boston Red Sox players
Los Angeles Dodgers coaches
Great Falls Giants players
Fresno Giants players
Lafayette Drillers players
Phoenix Giants players
Silver Slugger Award winners
People from New Brighton, Pennsylvania